Juan Francisco Arnaldo Isasi (died 1655) was a Roman Catholic prelate who served as Bishop of Puerto Rico (1656–1661).

Biography
Juan Francisco Arnaldo Isasi was born in Jamaica. On May 29, 1656, he was appointed by the King of Spain and confirmed by Pope Alexander VII as Bishop of Puerto Rico. He served as Bishop of Puerto Rico until his death on April 4, 1661.

References

External links and additional sources
 (for Chronology of Bishops) 
 (for Chronology of Bishops) 

1661 deaths
Bishops appointed by Pope Alexander VII
17th-century Roman Catholic bishops in Puerto Rico